The Movement of Democratic Action (Bosnian: Pokret demokratske akcije or PDA) is a conservative political party in Bosnia and Herzegovina.

History
The party was founded by Mirsad Kukić in 2018. After Kukić was removed from the SDA Cantonal committee of Tuzla canton, because he worked against the party's by-law, he announced he would be making his own party named Movement of Democratic Action. He accused SDA of not working in the interest of the people of Tuzla canton, rather that they were only "working for personal gains". The PDA claims that it will work based on the ideas of former SDA presidents Alija Izetbegović and Sulejman Tihić.

In the 2018 general elections, the PDA managed to obtain 38,417 (2.32%) votes and one seat in the House of Representatives.

Elections

Parliamentary elections

See also
Party of Democratic Action

References

Bosniak political parties in Bosnia and Herzegovina
2018 establishments in Bosnia and Herzegovina
Political parties established in 2018
Tuzla Canton